Brett Andrew Steven (born 27 April 1969) is a former New Zealand tennis player.

Biography

Steven began his tennis career at the age of 10 as a ball boy and by the age of 16 he participated at his first tournament. He attended Mount Roskill Grammar School.

Steven turned professional in 1988 and won his first tour doubles title in 1991 at Newport, Rhode Island.

Steven's best singles performance at a Grand Slam event came at the 1993 Australian Open, where he reached the quarterfinals, defeating Dave Randall, Thomas Muster, Andrei Olhovskiy and Richard Fromberg before being knocked out by Pete Sampras. At Masters level, he reached the quarterfinals of the 1993 Canada Masters and the 1998 Rome Masters.

Steven represented New Zealand at the 1996 Summer Olympics in Atlanta, Georgia, where he lost in the first round to Arnaud Boetsch of France.

Steven won nine top-level doubles titles during his career, the most significant of which was the Indian Wells Masters, which he won in 1995 (partnering Tommy Ho). Though he did not win any top-level singles titles during his career, Steven was a singles runner-up at three tour events (Schenectady in 1993, Auckland in 1996 and Newport in 1997). His career-high rankings were World No. 32 in singles and No. 16 in doubles. His career prize-money totalled US$2,439,714. Steven retired from the professional tour in 1999.

Junior Grand Slam finals

Doubles: 1 (1 runner-up)

ATP career finals

Singles: 3 (3 runner-ups)

Doubles: 17 (9 title, 8 runner-ups)

ATP Challenger and ITF Futures finals

Singles: 6 (3–3)

Doubles: 2 (0–2)

Performance timelines

Singles

Doubles

References

External links
 
 
 

1969 births
Living people
People educated at Mount Roskill Grammar School
New Zealand male tennis players
Olympic tennis players of New Zealand
Tennis players from Auckland
Tennis players at the 1996 Summer Olympics